The 2014 General Cup was a professional non-ranking snooker tournament that took place between 12 and 18 October 2014 at the General Snooker Club in Hong Kong.

Barry Hawkins was to take part in the tournament, but he was replaced by Liang Wenbo due to a neck injury.

The General Cup marked the return of Ali Carter, who was playing in his first event since his chemotherapy treatment, having been diagnosed with testicular cancer that had spread to his lungs in May. Carter intended to take part in the Bulgarian Open, but he was forced to withdraw.

Mark Davis was the defending champion, but he lost 2–6 against Ali Carter in the semi-final.

Carter won his sixth professional title by defeating Shaun Murphy 7–6 in the final.

Prize fund
The breakdown of prize money for this year is shown below:
 Winner: $120,000
 Runner-up: $60,000
 Semi-final: $40,000
 Third in group: $25,000
 Fourth in group: $20,000
 Wildcard round: $20,000
 Per century break: $2,000
 Highest break: $20,000
 Maximum break: $367,000

Wildcard round
The wildcard match was played on 12 October, was the best of 11 frames and decided the fourth player in group B.

Round robin stage
The top two players from both groups qualified for the knock-out stage. All group matches were held between 13 and 16 October and were the best of 7 frames.

Group A

 Joe Perry 0–4 Mark Davis
 Ricky Walden 4–2 Jimmy White
 Mark Davis 3–4 Jimmy White
 Joe Perry 4–0 Ricky Walden
 Ricky Walden 1–4 Mark Davis
 Joe Perry 4–3 Jimmy White

Group B

 Shaun Murphy 4–1 Liang Wenbo
 Marco Fu 1–4 Ali Carter
 Shaun Murphy 4–1 Ali Carter
 Marco Fu 3–4 Liang Wenbo
 Ali Carter 4–2 Liang Wenbo
 Shaun Murphy 4–2 Marco Fu

Knock-out stage

Century breaks

 144, 101  Shaun Murphy
 139, 112, 105, 101  Ali Carter
 136, 115, 104  Joe Perry
 120, 107  Liang Wenbo
 110, 104  Mark Davis
 108  Jimmy White

Notes

References

2014
2014 in snooker
2014 in Hong Kong sport
October 2014 sports events in China